Lisbon Community School is a grade K-6 Elementary School in Lisbon, Maine, but as of April, 2007, Lisbon School Department has decided that it will become a K-5 school.

Public elementary schools in Maine
Schools in Androscoggin County, Maine